Argas is a genus of tick.

Species

 Argas abdussalami Hoogstraal & McCarthy, 1965
 Argas acinus Whittick, 1938
 Argas africolumbae Hoogstraal, Kaiser, Walker, Ledger, Converse & Rice, 1975
 Argas arboreus Kaiser, Hoogstraal & Kohls, 1964
 Argas assimilis Teng & Song, 1983
 Argas beijingensis Teng, 1983
 Argas beklemischevi Pospelova-Shtrom, Vasil'eva & Semashko, 1963
 Argas brevipes Banks, 1908
 Argas brumpti Neumann, 1907
 Argas bureschi Dryenski, 1957
 Argas canestrinii Birula, 1895
 Argas cooleyi Kohls & Hoogstraal, 1960
 Argas cooleyi McIvor, 1941
 Argas cucumerinus Neumann, 1901
 Argas dalei Clifford, Keirans, Hoogstraal & Corwin, 1976
 Argas delanoei Roubaud & Colas-Belcour, 1931
 Argas dulus Keirans, Clifford & Capriles, 1971
 Argas eboris Theiler, 1959
 Argas echinops Hoogstraal, Uilenberg & Blanc, 1967
 Argas falco Kaiser & Hoogstraal, 1974
 Argas foleyi Parrot, 1928
 Argas giganteus Kohls & Clifford, 1968
 Argas gilcolladoi Estrada-Peña, Lucientes & Sánchez, 1987
 Argas hermanni Audouin, 1827
 Argas himalayensis Hoogstraal & Kaiser, 1973
 Argas hoogstraali Morel & Vassiliades, 1965
 Argas japonicus Yamaguti, Clifford & Tipton, 1968
 Argas keiransi Estrada-Peña, Venzal & González-Acuña, 2003
 Argas lagenoplastis Froggatt, 1906
 Argas lahorensis Neumann, 1908
 Argas latus Filippova, 1961
 Argas lowryae Kaiser & Hoogstraal, 1975
 Argas macrostigmatus Filippova, 1961
 Argas magnus Neumann, 1896
 Argas miniatus Koch, 1844
 Argas monachus Keirans, Radovsky & Clifford, 1973
 Argas monolakensis Schwan, Corwin & Brown, 1992
 Argas moreli Keirans, Hoogstraal & Clifford, 1979
 Argas neghmei Kohls & Hoogstraal, 1961
 Argas nullarborensis Hoogstraal & Kaiser, 1973
 Argas peringueyi Bedford & Hewitt, 1925
 Argas persicus Oken, 1818
 Argas peusi Schulze, 1943
 Argas polonicus Siuda, Hoogstraal, Clifford & Wassef, 1979
 Argas radiatus Railliet, 1893
 Argas reflexus Fabricius, 1794
 Argas ricei Hoogstraal, Kaiser, Clifford & Keirans, 1975
 Argas robertsi Hoogstraal, Kaiser & Kohls, 1968
 Argas sanchezi Dugès, 1887
 Argas streptopelia Kaiser, Hoogstraal & Horner, 1970
 Argas striatus Bedford, 1932
 Argas theilerae Hoogstraal & Kaiser, 1970
 Argas transgariepinus White, 1846
 Argas tridentatus Filippova, 1961
 Argas vansomereni Keirans, Hoogstraal & Clifford, 1977
 Argas vulgaris Filippova, 1961
 Argas walkerae Kaiser & Hoogstraal, 1969
 Argas zumpti Hoogstraal, Kaiser & Kohls, 1968

References

Ticks
Argasidae